This is a list of intermediate and immediate geographic regions of Brazil, which represent the regional division of the country created by the Brazilian Institute of Geography and Statistics (IBGE) in 2017.

Brazil is made up of five geographic regions (North, Northeast, Southeast, South and central-West) that comprise 27 federative units and, for their part include 5570 municipalities. In total, the municipalities are distributed in 510 immediate geographic regions, which in turn are grouped into 133 intermediate geographic regions. The list is divided between the five Brazilian geographic regions and the regional divisions are ordered by IBGE coding.

North

Northeast

Central-West

Southeast

South

References

Demographics of Brazil
.
Subdivisions of Brazil